Valdepolo is a municipality located in the province of León, Castile and León, Spain. According to the 2004 census (INE), the municipality has a population of 1,481 inhabitants.

See also
Quintana del Monte (León)

References

Municipalities in the Province of León